Quatre Bras is a crossroads in Belgium south of Brussels where the Battle of Quatre Bras was fought in 1815. Quatre Bras (French for "four arms" and a common name for a crossroads), may also refer to:

Quatre Bras, Tervuren, a cross roads in Tervuren between the Avenue de Tervueren (Brussels-Tervuren road) and the Brussels outer ring R0
The name of 'Four Arms' in the Dutch-language version of Ben 10

See also
 Battle of Quatre Bras (16 June 1815), fought between Wellington's Anglo-Dutch army and the left wing of the Armée du Nord under Marshal Michel Ney
 Quatre Bras order of battle
 Quatre Bras: Stalemate on the Brussels Road, a 1976 board wargame that simulates the battle